Love the Woman is the fifth solo album by singer Chanté Moore. It was released by Peak Records on June 17, 2008 in the United States. Her debut with the label, it marked her first release without husband Kenny Lattimore as a duet partner since the release of her 2000 album Exposed. Moore reunited with producer George Duke and consulted Raphael Saadiq and Warryn Campbell to work with her on Love the Woman with the result that it encompasses contemporary R&B, jazz, and pop, and also finds Moore personalizing songs by two past artists, including Minnie Riperton and Nancy Wilson. Love the Woman spawned the single "It Ain't Supposed to Be This Way" which peaked at number 21 on Billboards Adult R&B Songs chart.

Critical reception

Allmusic editor Andy Kellman found that Love the Woman "sounds like a natural extension" of Moore's previous album Exposed, "in fact, even though it clearly had a lower production budget (she's now on an independent) and is not aiming at the pop chart [...] Since many of the slow-pulse productions run together, with little to distinguish themselves from one another, it can take a couple listens to grasp which is which. It doesn't help that the only truly uptempo track, "Can't Do It," does not fit into this smooth and polished set in any way, with its vinyl crackle, overbearing horn blurts, touches of unnecessary vocal effects, and lyrics Moore does not seem to be feeling all that much."

Chart performance
Love the Woman debuted and peaked at number 110 on the US Billboard 200 and number 14 on the Top R&B/Hip-Hop Albums. By November 2008, it had sold 25,000 copies in the US.

Track listing

Notes
 denotes additional producer

Charts

References

2008 albums
Chanté Moore albums
Peak Records albums
Albums produced by George Duke
Albums produced by Raphael Saadiq
Albums produced by Warryn Campbell